Laurent-Emmanuel Calvet (born 28 February 1969) is a French economist. He taught at Harvard University, at HEC Paris, and is now Professor of Finance at EDHEC Business School.

Early years 

Calvet was born on 28 February 1969. He attended Lycée Janson de Sailly and Lycée Louis-le-Grand in Paris. He obtained engineering degrees from École Polytechnique in 1991 and École des ponts ParisTech in 1994. He went on to complete his M.A., M.Phil. and Ph.D. (1998) in economics from Yale University.

Academic career 
Calvet served as an assistant professor and then as the John Loeb associate professor of the Social Sciences at Harvard University from 1998 to 2004. He taught finance at HEC Paris from 2004 to 2016. Calvet was also a professor and chair in finance at Imperial College London from 2007 to 2008. Specialist in asset pricing, household finance, and volatility modelling, Laurent Calvet joined the EDHEC Business School faculty in 2016 as a professor of finance.

In 2006, Calvet received the “Best Finance Researcher under the Age of 40” award from Le Monde and the Europlace Institute of Finance.

Contributions 
Calvet is known for his research in financial economics, household finance, and econometrics. He pioneered with Adlai Fisher the Markov switching multifractal model of financial volatility, which is used by academics and financial practitioners to forecast volatility, compute value-at-risk, and price derivatives. This approach is summarized in the book “Multifractal Volatility: Theory, Forecasting and Pricing” (2008).

In a 2007 publication, Laurent E. Calvet, John Y. Campbell and Paolo Sodini show that households hold well-diversified portfolios of financial assets, consistent with the predictions of portfolio theory. This result confirms a key assumption of the Capital asset pricing model. Subsequent work confirms that household follow other important precepts of financial theory, such as portfolio rebalancing  and habit formation.

Calvet has also contributed to statistical filtering theory. He developed with Veronika Czellar and Elvezio Ronchetti robust filtering techniques that can withstand model misspecifications and outliers. The robust filter naturally solves the degeneracy problem that plagues the particle filter of Gordon, Salmond, and Smith and its many extensions.

See also
Financial risk
Fractal 
Markov chain
Modern portfolio theory
Multifractal system

References

External links 
  Research homepage
 CV
 
 Laurent-Emmanuel Calvet at HEC Pars
 Laurent E. Calvet on Google Scholar

1969 births
Living people
Financial economists
French economists
Harvard University faculty
Yale Graduate School of Arts and Sciences alumni
Place of birth missing (living people)
Academic staff of HEC Paris